Georgina Adam is a journalist, public speaker, art market expert and author.

She has been a Financial Times contributor and art market editor-at-large of The Art Newspaper where she began her career as a journalist in the late 80's. She lectures at the Sotheby's Institute in London. She is a member of the International Association of Art Critics and The International Art Market Studies Association. Adam also serves as the chair of the Art Business Conference. In 2018 she became the chair of the membership committee of Cromwell Place.

Adam's book, Big Bucks: The Explosion of the Art Market in the 21st Century (2014), discusses big art dealers in a frank, unflinching manner. She also explains how the art market works and how art is rated and valued. Adam's second book, Dark Side of the Boom (Lund Humphries, December 2017), scrutinizes the excesses of the 21st-century contemporary art market explosion. The Telegraph called Dark Side of the Boom a "'must read' for anyone with an interest in the relationship between art and money. It covers buying of art as an investment, the flourishing art storage sector, temptations to forgery and fraud, tax evasion, money laundering, the upheavals in auction houses and the impact of the enhanced use of financial instruments on art transactions. She also looks at whether big money is eroding creativity in art. In the wake of the Panama Papers revelations, she incorporates examples of the way tax havens have been used to stash art transactions – and ownership – away from public scrutiny.

Adam has spoken about a "1–4 per cent rule", which indicates people should not spend more than that amount of their net worth on an individual piece of artwork.

Books
 Big Bucks: The explosion of the art market in the 21st Century (Lund Humphries, 2014)  
 Dark Side of the Boom: The Excesses Of The Art Market In The 21st Century (Paperback – 1 February 2018) 
The Rise and Rise of the Private Art Museum (Lund Humphries, Sotheby's Institute of Art, Hardback, 30 September 2021) ISBN 978-1848223844

See also
The Lost Leonardo, 2021 film in which Adam is interviewed

References

External links
Georgina Adam, Financial Times
Georgina Adam, The Art Newspaper
Georgina Adam, The Art Business Conference
 Being a Collector as a Lifestyle Choice: Interview with Georgina Adam on COBO.

British art critics
Living people
British writers
Year of birth missing (living people)